Unmanned aircraft system traffic management (UTM) is an air traffic management ecosystem under development for autonomously controlled operations of unmanned aerial systems (UAS) by the FAA, NASA, other federal partner agencies, and industry. They are collaboratively exploring concepts of operation, data exchange requirements, and a supporting framework to enable multiple UAS operations beyond visual line-of-sight at altitudes under 400 ft above ground level in airspace where FAA air traffic services are not provided.

UTM is separate from but complementary to the FAA's Air Traffic Management (ATM) system. UTM development will ultimately identify services, roles/responsibilities, information architecture, data exchange protocols, software functions, infrastructure, and performance requirements for enabling the management of low-altitude uncontrolled UAS operations.

A Research Transition Team (RTT) has been established between the FAA, NASA and industry to coordinate the UTM initiative. Areas of focus include concept and use case development, data exchange and information architecture, communications and navigation, and sense and avoid. Research and testing will identify airspace operations requirements to enable safe visual and beyond visual line-of-sight UAS flights in low-altitude airspace. FAA published a UAS Traffic Management Research Plan in 2017.

Operation Zenith 

On November 21, 2018, a total of 13 independent organisations took part in an event at Manchester Airport coordinated by UTM Service Provider Altitude Angel and Air Navigation Service Provider for the United Kingdom, NATS, which demonstrated the safe integration of unmanned traffic into controlled airspace.

It is regarded as one of the first live-demonstrations of its kind and was considered to be the "most technically complex and comprehensive demonstration in the world so far of a UTM system".

U-space 
The SESAR Joint Undertaking, which is a public-private partnership supported and funded by the European Union, Eurocontrol and a number of industry partners, has defined the U-Space Blueprint. U-space is a set of new services relying on a high level of digitalisation and automation of functions and specific procedures designed to support safe, efficient and secure access to airspace for large numbers of drones.
The EU regulations now requires implementation of a UTM system in order to support U-space by 26/1-2023.

References

Regulation of unmanned aerial vehicles
Air traffic management